Ashnaabad or Ashenaabad may refer to:
 Ashnaabad, West Azerbaijan